Blueprint is the third studio album and fourth album overall by Irish guitarist Rory Gallagher, released as a vinyl record in 1973. With his first band Taste and with his solo band up to this point Gallagher was one of the first guitarists to lead a power trio lineup.  With Blueprint Gallagher included a keyboardist for the first time.

Background
For Blueprint Gallagher replaced drummer  Wilgar Campbell with Rod de'Ath and decided to add Lou Martin, the keyboardist from de'Ath's previous band Killing Floor. This four-piece lineup was to be one of Gallagher's most successful resulting in many of his most popular songs and documented in live film and TV appearances on shows such as Rockpalast and the Old Grey Whistle Test. The band would play together for five years. Blueprint, as with all the studio albums recorded by the Gallagher quartet illustrated Gallagher's eclectic musical influences.

The album title and artwork were taken from the blueprint of a Stramp "Power Baby" amplifier that had been custom designed for Gallagher in Hamburg. "It was compact enough to fit into the small luggage compartment of a Volkswagen Beetle" recalled Gallagher's brother and manager Donal.

Track listing
All tracks composed by Rory Gallagher except where indicated.

Side one
"Walk on Hot Coals" – 7:04
"Daughter of the Everglades" – 6:14
"Banker's Blues" (Big Bill Broonzy) – 4:47
"Hands Off" – 4:32
Side two
"Race the Breeze" – 6:55
"Seventh Son of the Seventh Son" – 8:26
"Unmilitary Two-Step" – 2:50
"If I Had a Reason" – 4:31

CD bonus track
"Stompin' Ground (alt version 10)" – 3:32
"Treat Her Right" (Roy Head) – 4:01

Personnel
Rory Gallagher – guitars, harmonica, mandolin, saxophones, vocals
Gerry McAvoy – bass guitar
Lou Martin – keyboards, some guitar
Rod de'Ath – drums, percussion
Technical
Phil Dunn – engineer
Andrew Pearce – mastering
Andy Stephens, Phil Dunne – engineer
Mark Jessett – art direction
Tony Arnold – remastering

References

External links
 Rory Gallagher official site

1973 albums
Rory Gallagher albums
Albums produced by Rory Gallagher
Polydor Records albums